Gusti Yehoshua Braverman (Hebrew: גוסטי יהושע ברוורמן) is an Israeli activist who is the Chair of the World Zionist Organization's Department for Diaspora Activities. Her previous positions include being the deputy director of the Reform Movement in Israel, and the director of the Tamar Dance Company.

Biography
Gusti Yehoshua Braverman was born in Israel. She attended The Hebrew University of Jerusalem, graduating with a BA in Social Work and Mass Communication, and an MA in Mass Communication. She is also certified in Organizational Consulting by Tel Aviv University.

Public service career
Yehoshua Braverman was the director of the Tamar Dance Company in 1990–1992 and the Associate Director of Israeli Movement for Progressive Judaism from September 1993-July 2010.

Gusti represented the Reform Movement at the World Zionist Congress. She was  elected to the World Zionist Organization Executive at the 36th World Zionist Congress in 2010 as the co-chair of the Department for Zionist Activities in the Diaspora. She is now Chairman of the Department for Diaspora Activities. Since 2010, she has been a member of the Board of Governors of the Jewish Agency for Israel and a member of the Public Council to Commemorate Theodor Herzl.

As Chair of the Department for Diaspora Activities, she oversees the organization of Zionist educational programs and events, such as FeminIsrael, a celebration of Women's History Month and women in Israel. She spearheaded the creation of the "Beit Ha'am" series of Zionist educational texts and works closely with the Herzl Museum in Jerusalem on the creation of interactive educational exhibits.

References

External links 
 Haaretz - Gusti Yehoshua Braverman
 Zionist Federation of New Zealand - Gusti Yehoshua Braverman
 WZO Leader Calls on Diaspora Jews to Protest Discrimination

Paul Baerwald School of Social Work and Social Welfare alumni
Israeli Reform Jews
Living people
Israeli women activists
Zionist activists
Year of birth missing (living people)
People of the Jewish Agency for Israel
Hebrew University of Jerusalem Faculty of Social Sciences alumni
Jewish women activists